Branimir "Branko" Šegota (born June 8, 1961) is a Canadian former professional soccer forward, starring in the original Major Indoor Soccer League (MISL), the North American Soccer League (NASL), the Continental Indoor Soccer League (CISL), the National Professional Soccer League, and the Canadian Soccer League.

Club career
Born in Rijeka, then part of PR Croatia, FPR Yugoslavia, Branko Šegota moved with his family to Canada at the age of 7. Raised in Toronto, Šegota began his pro soccer career at age 17, signing with the New York Arrows of MISL. Before he began his indoor career he played in the National Soccer League in 1978 with Montreal Castors. He was named NASL's North American player of the year in 1984 with the Golden Bay Earthquakes. He played indoors (in 1994 and 1995) for the Las Vegas Dustdevils of the CISL and as recently as 1997 for the Baltimore Spirit of the National Professional Soccer League.

Šegota scored 73 goals in 147 regular season NASL games to rank 13th in the history of the league.  He also scored 12 goals in 13 play-off games, including 11 in the 1981 play-offs. In the history of the original MISL he ranked second in career goal and points scoring with 463 goals and 841 points.  His 378 assists ranks him third.  His being nine MISL championship teams, three with the Arrows and 6 with the Sockers is also a record. He was a five-time MISL all-star.

International career
Šegota earned 20 caps for Canada including appearances as a substitute in all 3 of the country's 1986 World Cup games. He played for Canada at the 1979 FIFA World Youth Championship, scoring twice in a 3–1 win over Portugal. He earned his first senior cap in a 1–1 World Cup qualifying draw against Mexico in 1980. Šegota scored three goals in his 20 appearances. His final cap came in a 3–2 win over Guatemala in a World Cup qualifier in 1988. He was inducted into the Canadian Soccer Hall of Fame in 2002.

International goals
Scores and results list Canada's goal tally first.

Coaching career
Šegota served as an assistant coach with the Cleveland Internationals of the Premier Development League in 2004 after coaching their youth program for 6 years. He has three children, Ashley, Toni, and Emma, with his wife Ena Šegota.

References

External links

 / Canada Soccer Hall of Fame
NASL/MISL stats

1961 births
Living people
Baltimore Spirit players
Canada men's international soccer players
Canada Soccer Hall of Fame inductees
Canadian National Soccer League players
Canadian Soccer League (1987–1992) players
Canadian soccer players
Canadian expatriate soccer players
Canada men's youth international soccer players
Croatian emigrants to Canada
1986 FIFA World Cup players
Association football forwards
Expatriate soccer players in the United States
Canadian expatriate sportspeople in the United States
Fort Lauderdale Strikers (1977–1983) players
Indoor soccer players
Major Indoor Soccer League (1978–1992) players
Montreal Castors players
National Professional Soccer League (1984–2001) players
Naturalized citizens of Canada
North American Soccer League (1968–1984) players
North American Soccer League (1968–1984) indoor players
New York Arrows players
Soccer people from Ontario
Footballers from Rijeka
St. Louis Storm players
Rochester Lancers (1967–1980) players
San Diego Sockers (original MISL) players
San Jose Earthquakes (1974–1988) players
Toronto Blizzard (1986–1993) players
Continental Indoor Soccer League players
Las Vegas Dustdevils players
Yugoslav emigrants to Canada
USL League Two coaches
Cleveland Internationals
Canadian soccer coaches